Sacaton or Socatoon was a village of the Maricopa people, established above the Pima Villages, (now the Gila River Indian Community) after the June 1, 1857, in the Battle of Pima Butte where it appears a few months later in the 1857 Chapman Census.  Sacaton village lay on the Gila River, 3.75 miles west of modern Sacaton.

The 1858–1861 Socatoon Station of the Butterfield Overland Mail located four miles east of the village took its name from this village.

See also
 Sacate, Arizona, current name of location
 Pima villages

References

Gila River
Native American history of Arizona
History of Arizona
Former populated places in Pinal County, Arizona
1857 establishments in New Mexico Territory